Ray Ricky Armstead (born May 27, 1960 in St. Louis, Missouri) was a 1984 Summer Olympics gold medalist in the men's 4x400 meter relay for the United States.

References
 

1960 births
Living people
Track and field athletes from St. Louis
Athletes (track and field) at the 1984 Summer Olympics
Olympic gold medalists for the United States in track and field
Medalists at the 1984 Summer Olympics
American male sprinters